Shane Rehm is a New Zealand rugby league referee. An international referee, Rehm has also controlled Auckland Rugby League, New Zealand Rugby League and Toyota Cup matches since 2009.

Playing career
Rehm has refereed in NSW Cup and Toyota Cup matches. On 26 June 2011 he was appointed to be a touch judge in a National Rugby League match.

In 2012 he received a Prime Minister's Scholarship from Sport NZ to allow him to travel to Australia to further his refereeing career.

International career
Rehm was named the New Zealand Rugby League's 2010 referee of the year. As a result, he was appointed to be New Zealand's referee in the 2010 Four Nations and he also controlled the New Zealand national rugby league team test match against Samoa. He was a touch judge in the 2011 Four Nations final.

References

Year of birth missing (living people)
Living people
New Zealand rugby league referees